Sophia Loren: Her Own Story is a 1980 American made-for-television biographical film directed by Mel Stuart and starring Sophia Loren as herself. The film was written by Joanna Crawford based on the 1979 biographical book Sophia, Living and Loving: Her Own Story by A.E. Hotchner and originally aired on NBC on October 26, 1980.

Plot
A dramatization of the life of Italian actress Sophia Loren from her childhood in Naples to her international stardom. Loren plays herself during adulthood and her mother Romilda Villani.

Cast
Sophia Loren as Sophia / Romilda Villani
Ritza Brown as Sophia (aged 16)
Chiara Ferraro as Sophia (aged 4–7)
Armand Assante as  Riccardo Scicolone 
John Gavin as Cary Grant
Rip Torn as Carlo Ponti
Theresa Saldana as Maria Scicolone
Edmund Purdom as Vittorio De Sica
Riccardo Cucciolla as Dominico Villani 
Anna Miserocchi as Louisa Villani
Francesca De Sapio as Dora
Cyrus Elias as Guido

Production
"I thought it was an extremely dangerous thing to do", said Gavin of playing Cary Grant. "I wouldn't have touched the role if I thought it wasn't done in good taste... I realise I'm laying myself wide open to criticism. All I can say is I'll do the best I can."

References

External links

1980 television films
1980 films
1980s biographical films
American biographical films
Biographical television films
NBC network original films
Films based on biographies
Films about actors
Biographical films about actors
Films directed by Mel Stuart
Films scored by Fred Karlin
1980s American films